Theodoret of Cyrus or Cyrrhus (AD 393 –  458/466) was an influential theologian of the School of Antioch, biblical commentator, and Christian bishop of Cyrrhus (423–457). He played a pivotal role in several 5th-century Byzantine Church controversies that led to various ecumenical acts and schisms. He wrote against Cyril of Alexandria's 12 Anathemas which were sent to Nestorius and did not personally condemn Nestorius until the Council of Chalcedon. His writings against Cyril were included in the Three Chapters Controversy and were condemned at the Second Council of Constantinople. Some Chalcedonian and East Syriac Christians regard him as a "full" saint.

Biography
According to Tillemont, he was born at Antioch in 393, and died either at Cyrrhus ("about a two-days' journey east of Antioch" or eighty Roman miles), or at the monastery near Apamea (fifty-four miles south-east of Antioch) about 457.

The following facts about his life are gleaned mainly from his Epistles and his Religious History (Philotheos historia). He was the child of a prosperous Antiochene couple who had been childless for many years. Encouraged by the fact that his mother had been cured of a serious eye complaint and converted to a sober life by Peter the Galatian, an ascetic living in an unoccupied in the locality, Theodoret's parents sought further help from the local holy men, since she had been childless for twelve years. For years their hopes were fed but not fulfilled. Eventually, Theodoret's birth was promised by a hermit named Macedonius the Barley-Eater on the condition of his dedication to God, whence the name Theodoret ("gift of God").

Theodoret received an extensive religious and secular education. The actual evidence given to us by Theodoret suggests that his education was exclusively religious. He paid weekly visits to Peter the Galatian, was instructed by Macedonius and other ascetics, and at an early age became a lector among the clergy of Antioch. Though he speaks of Diodore of Tarsus and Theodore of Mopsuestia as his teachers, this is improbable - though it was certainly their theological tradition in which he was brought up. He clearly, also, though, received an extensive classical education, unsurprisingly for the child of prosperous parents in a city which had long been a centre of secular learning and culture. His correspondents included the sophists Aerius and Isokasius. He understood Syriac as well as Greek, but was not acquainted with either Hebrew or Latin. In his letters he quotes from Homer, Sophocles, Euripides, Aristophanes, Demosthenes and Thucydides. When he was twenty-three years old and both parents were dead, he divided his fortune among the poor (Epist. cxiii; P.G., LXXXIII, 1316) and became a monk in the monastery of Nicerte not far from Apamea. There he lived for about seven years.

In 423 he left as he had been appointed Bishop of Cyrrhus, over a diocese about forty miles square and embracing 800 parishes, but with an insignificant town as its see city. Theodoret, supported only by the appeals of the intimate hermits, himself in personal danger, zealously guarded purity of the doctrine. He converted more than 1,000 Marcionites in his diocese, besides many Arians and Macedonians; more than 200 copies of Tatian's Diatessaron he retired from the churches; and he erected churches and supplied them with relics.

His philanthropic and economic interests were extensive and varied: he endeavoured to secure relief for the people oppressed with taxation; he divided his inheritance among the poor; from his episcopal revenues he erected baths, bridges, halls, and aqueducts; he summoned rhetoricians and physicians, and reminded the officials of their duties. To the persecuted Christians of Persian Armenia he sent letters of encouragement, and to the Carthaginian Celestiacus, who had fled the rule of the Vandals, he gave refuge.

The Nestorian controversy
Theodoret stands out prominently in the Christological controversies aroused by Cyril of Alexandria. Theodoret shared in the petition of John I of Antioch to Nestorius to approve of the term theotokos ("mother of God"), and upon the request of John wrote against Cyril's anathemas.

He may have prepared the Antiochian symbol which was to secure the emperor's true understanding of the Nicene Creed, and he was a member and spokesman of the deputation of eight from Antioch called by the emperor to Chalcedon. To the condemnation of Nestorius he could not assent. John, reconciled to Cyril by the emperor's order, sought to bring Theodoret to submission by entrenching upon his eparchy.

Theodoret was determined to preserve the peace of the Church by seeking the adoption of a formula avoiding the unconditional condemnation of Nestorius, and toward the close of 434 strove earnestly for the reconciliation between the Eastern churches. But Cyril refused to compromise and when he opened his attack (437) upon Diodorus of Tarsus and Theodore, John sided with them and Theodoret assumed the defence of the Antiochian party ( 439). Domnus II, the successor of John, took him as his counsellor. After the death of Cyril, adherents of the Antiochian theology were appointed to bishoprics. Irenaeus the friend of Nestorius, with the cooperation of Theodoret, became bishop of Tyre, in spite of the protests of Dioscorus, Cyril's successor, who now turned specially against Theodoret; and secured the order from the court confining Theodoret to Cyrrhus.

Theodoret now composed the Eranistes (see below). In vain were his efforts at court at self-justification against the charges of Dioscurus, as well as the countercharge of Domnus against Eutyches of Apollinarism. The court excluded Theodoret from the Second Council of Ephesus in 449 because of his antagonism to Cyril. Here, because of his Epistle 151 against Cyril and his defence of Diodorus and Theodore, he was condemned without a hearing and excommunicated and his writings were directed to be burned. Even Domnus gave his assent.

Theodoret was compelled to leave Cyrrhus and retire to his monastery at Apamea. He made an appeal to Leo the Great, but not until after the death of Theodosius II in 450 was his appeal for a revocation of the judgments against him granted by imperial edict. He was ordered to participate in the Council of Chalcedon, which created violent opposition. He was first to take part only as accuser, yet among the bishops. Then he was constrained (October 26, 451) by the friends of Dioscurus to pronounce the anathema over Nestorius. His conduct shows (though hindered from a statement to that effect) that he performed this with his previous reservation; namely, without application beyond the teaching of two sons in Christ and the denial of the theotokos. Upon this he was declared orthodox and rehabilitated.

The only thing known concerning him following the Council of Chalcedon is the letter of Leo charging him to guard the Chalcedonian victory (PG, lxxxiii. 1319 sqq.). With Diodorus and Theodore he was no less hated by the Miaphysites than Nestorius himself, and held by them and their friends as a heretic. After Chalcedon, he lived in Cyrrhus until his death, which may have been in 460.

The Three-Chapter Controversy led to the condemnation of his writings against Cyril in the Second Council of Constantinople (553).

Works

Exegetical
The most significant works of Theodoret are those of exegesis.

A chronology of the composition of these works can be developed by studying references in the latter works to the earlier works. The commentary on the Song of Songs, written while he was a young bishop, though not before 430, precedes Psalms; the commentaries on the prophets were begun with Daniel, followed by Ezekiel, and then the Minor Prophets. Next that on the Psalms was completed before 436; and those on Isaiah, Jeremiah, and the Pauline Epistles (including Hebrews), before 448. Theodoret's last exegetical works were the interpretations of difficult passages in the Octateuch and Quaestiones dealing with the books of Samuel, Kings, and Chronicles, written about 452 to 453.

Excepting the commentary on Isaiah (fragments preserved in the catenae) and on Galatians ii.6-13, the exegetical writings of Theodoret are extant. Exegetical material on the Gospels under his name in the catenae may have come from his other works, and foreign interpolations occur in his comments on the Octateuch.

His representation of orthodox doctrine consists of a collocation of Scripture passages.

The biblical authors are, for Theodoret, merely the mouthpieces of the Holy Spirit, though they do not lose their individual peculiarities. By the unavoidable imperfection of the translations, he states, the understanding is encumbered. Not familiar with Hebrew, Theodoret uses the Syriac translation, the Greek versions, and the Septuagint.

In principle his exegesis is grammatical-historical; and he criticizes the intrusion of the author's own ideas. His aim is to avoid a one-sidedness of literalness as well as of allegory. Hence he protests against the attributing of The Song of Songs to Solomon and the like as degrading the Holy Spirit. Rather is it to be said that the Scripture speaks often "figuratively" and "in riddles." In the Old Testament everything has typological significance and prophetically it embodies already the Christian doctrine. The divine illumination affords the right understanding after the apostolic suggestion and the New Testament fulfilment. Valuable though not binding is the exegetical tradition of the ecclesiastical teachers. Theodoret likes to choose the best among various interpretations before him, preferably Theodore's, and supplements from his own. He is clear and simple in thought and statement; and his merit is to have rescued the exegetical heritage of the school of Antioch as a whole for the Christian Church.

Dogmatic
Many of Theodoret's dogmatic works have perished; five, however, have survived.

His chief Christological work is the Eranistes etoi polymorphos (Beggar or Multiform, or perhaps The Collector) in three dialogues, describing the Monophysites as beggars passing off their doctrines gathered by scraps from diverse heretical sources and himself as the orthodox. The work is interspersed with lengthy florilegia (anthologies of patristic citations), which may be the reason for its preservation. These florilegia provide evidence of Theodoret's considerable learning, with 238 texts drawn from 88 works, including pre-Nicene writers such as Ignatius, Irenaeus and Hippolytus, as well as theologians such as Athanasius and the Cappadocian Fathers. This use of florilegia heralds a new stage in doctrinal development, in that it creates a new authority for Christian theology: that of the 'Fathers'.

Two works, On the Holy and Life-giving Trinity and On the Incarnation of the Lord,  have survived through ascription to his opponent Cyril of Alexandria.

Another surviving work by Theodoret is his Refutation of the Anathemas, his rejection of the twelve anathemas pronounced on him by Cyril of Alexandria, which has been preserved in Cyril's defence. He detects Apollinarianism in Cyril's teaching, and declines a "contracting into one" of two natures of the only begotten, as much as a separation into two sons (Epist. Cxliii). Instead of a "union according to hypostases," he would accept only one that "manifests the essential properties or modes of the natures." The man united to God was born of Mary; between God the Logos and the form of a servant a distinction must be drawn.

Another surviving work is the Expositio rectae fidei. This was preserved among the writings of Justin Martyr. However, both Lebon (1930) and Sellers (1945) independently recognised it as the work of Theodoret, probably pre-dating the outbreak of the Christological controversies.

Only minor fragments (cf. Epist. 16) of Theodoret's defence of Diodorus and Theodore (438-444) have been preserved.

There are many lost works. Theodoret mentions having written against Arius and Eunomius, probably one work, to which were joined the three treatises against the Macedonians. There were, besides, two works against the Apollinarians, and of the Opus adversus Marcionem nothing has been preserved.

God is immutable also in becoming man, the two natures are separate in Christ, and God the Logos is ever immortal and impassive. Each nature remained "pure" after the union, retaining its properties to the exclusion of all transmutation and intermixture. Of the twenty-seven orations in defence of various propositions, the first six agree in their given content with Theodoret. A few extracts from the five orations on Chrysostom were preserved by Photius (codex 273).

Apologetic, historical
Among apologetic writings was the Ad quaestiones magorum (429-436), now lost, in which Theodoret justified the Old Testament sacrifices as alternatives in opposition to the Egyptian idolatry, and exposed the fables of the Magi who worshipped the elements (Church History v. 38).

De providentia, or Ten Discourses on Providence, consists of apologetic discourses, proving the divine providence from the physical order (chapters i-iv), and from the moral and social order (chapters vi-x). They were most probably delivered to the cultured Greek congregation of Antioch, sometime between 431 and 435. Unlike most sermons, they are reasoned arguments, lectures rather than homilies on scriptural texts.

The Graecarum Affectionum Curatio or Cure of the Greek Maladies, subtitled The Truth of the Gospel proved from Greek Philosophy, arranged in twelve books, was an attempt to prove the truth of Christianity from Greek philosophy and in contrast with the pagan ideas and practises. As such, it forms one of the last Apologies written, since in an age when Christianity was dominant, the need for apologies gradually died out. The truth is self-consistent where it is not obscured with error and approves itself as the power of life; philosophy is only a presentiment of it. This work is distinguished for clearness of arrangement and style.

The Ecclesiastical History of Theodoret, which begins with the rise of Arianism and closes with the death of Theodore in 429 (despite being completed in 449–450) is very different in style from those of Socrates Scholasticus and Sozomen. It contains many sources otherwise lost, specially letters on the Arian controversy; however, the book is extremely partisan, the heretics being consistently blackened and described as afflicted with the 'Arian plague'. The narrative is more compressed than in the other historians, and Theodoret often strings documents together, with only brief comments between. Original material of Antiochian information appears chiefly in the latter books.

Theodoret's sources are in dispute. According to Valesius these were mainly Socrates and Sozomen; Albert Guldenpenning's thorough research placed Rufinus first, and next to him, Eusebius of Caesarea, Athanasius, Sozomen, Sabinus, Philostorgius, Gregory Nazianzen, and, least of all, Socrates. N. Glubokovskij counts Eusebius, Rufinus, Philostorgius, and, perhaps, Sabinus.

The Religious History, with an appendix on divine love, contains the biographies of thirty (ten living) ascetics, held forth as religious models. It is a document of remarkable significance for understanding the complexities of the role of early monastics, both in society and in the church; it is also remarkable for presenting a model of ascetic authority which runs strongly against Athanasius's Life of Antony.

Upon the request of a high official named Sporacius, Theodoret compiled a Compendium of Heretical Accounts (Haereticarum fabularum compendium), including a heresiology (books i-iv) and a "compendium of divine dogmas" (book v), which, apart from Origen's De principiis and the theological work of John of Damascus, is the only systematic representation of the theology of the Greek Fathers.

Letters
Compared to the more than 500 letters known to Nicephorus Callistus in the fourteenth century, only about half that number had survived to the twentieth century. Three collections survive, though there is some overlap between them. 179 letters were edited by J Sirmond in the seventeenth century. To these, J. Sakkelion added another 47 letters he published from a manuscript he found at the Monastery of Patmos in 1855. 36 letters have been preserved in conciliar records. These letters provide glimpses of rural Christianity in northern Syria, as well as insight into episcopal relationships; hints of the development of Christological issues between the Councils of Ephesus and Chalcedon can be seen; there are letters of consolation and commendation; throughout there is revealed the generous and sensitive soul of a pastor.

An English translation of the surviving letters is part of the Nicene and Post-Nicene Fathers (2 ser., iii. 250–348).

Linguistic interest
In several works, Theodoret demonstrated an interest for linguistic issues related to translations of sacred texts and theological works, with emphasis on literary exchange between two languages, Greek and Syriac. Theodoret himself belonged to the highly Hellenized urban landscape of Roman Syria, but his Aramaic background, accompanied with knowledge of Aramaic language (called Syriac among Greeks), enabled him to note several features of his ancestral language. Aware of regional diversities of Aramaic dialects, he recorded that "the Osroënians, the Syrians, the people of the Euphrates, the Palestinians, and the Phoenicians all speak Syriac, but with many differences in pronunciation". Theodoret's regional (provincial) differentiation of Aramaic dialects included an explicit distinction between the "Syrians" (as Aramaic speakers of Syria proper, western of Euphrates), and the "Osroenians" as Aramaic speakers of Osroene (eastern region, centered in Edessa), thus showing that dialect of the "Syrians" (Aramaic speakers of proper Syria) was known to have somewhat different pronunciation from that of the "Osroenians" (speakers of Edessan Aramaic).

Translations
 Translations of some of Theodoret's writings can be found in Nicene and Post-Nicene Fathers.
A bilingual edition of the Eranistes was published by Oxford University Press in 1974.
Theodoret of Cyrus. On Divine Providence, translated and annotated by Thomas P. Halton, 1988 (Ancient Christian Writers, 49) 
Theodoret of Cyrus. A Cure for Pagan Maladies, translation and introduction by Thomas P. Halton, 2013 (Ancient Christian Writers, 67) 
 Ettlinger, GH, 2003. Theodoret: Eranistes, FC, Washington, DC: Catholic University of America Press.
 Petruccione, John F and RC Hill, 2007. Theodoret of Cyrus. The Questions on the Octateuch, Greek text and English translation, Washington, DC, Catholic University of America Press
 RC Hill has published translations into English of the Commentary on the Psalms (2000, 2001), the Commentary on the Songs of Songs (2001), and the Commentary on the Letters of St Paul (2001)
István Pásztori-Kupán, Theodoret of Cyrus, (Routledge, 2006), includes full translations of On the Trinity, On the Incarnation, and excerpts from A Cure of Greek Maladies and A Compendium of Heretical Mythification.
Bilingual editions (Greek text with parallel French translation) of several of the texts mentioned above have been published in recent years in Sources Chrétiennes.

Notes

References

Sources

External links

 
 Theodoret's works at CCEL
 Greek Opera Omnia by Migne Patrologia Graeca, with analytical indexes and concordances made on the whole writings
 István Pásztori-Kupán: Theodoret of Cyrus’s Double Treatise On the Trinity and On the Incarnation: The Antiochene Pathway to Chalcedon (PhD thesis)
 

390s births
450s deaths
Church Fathers
Assyrian Church of the East
Christian anti-Gnosticism
5th-century Syrian bishops
Ancient Christians involved in controversies
Apamea, Syria
Bible commentators
Nestorianism
People from Cyrrhus
5th-century Byzantine historians